Boinpalle or Boinpalli is a mandal in Rajanna Sircilla district in the state of Telangana in India.

Grama Panchayat villages
 Ananthapally                     
 Boinpalli
 Burugupalli
 Desaipalli
 Dundrapally 
 Gundannapalli 
 Jaggaraopally                 
 Kodurupaka
 Korem
 Kothapeta
 Malkapoor                     
 Manwada
 Marlapet
 Narsingapoor
 Neelojipally
 Ralla Ramannapeta                   
 Ratnampet               
 Shabashpalli
 Stambampalli                
 Thadagonda
 Vardavelly                    
 Venkatraopally                
 Vilasagar

Places to Visit
Burugupalli Ghadi is located in Burugupalli Village of Boinpalle Mandal. Built in 1878 by Madireddy family (Madireddy Ram Reddy).

References 

Villages in Rajanna Sircilla district